Last Resort is a 1986 comedy film directed by Zane Buzby and produced by Julie Corman. It revolves around George Lollar (Charles Grodin), who takes his family on vacation to "Club Sand", a shoddy and untrustworthy company. On this tropical island they find soldiers everywhere, an unhelpful staff, inhospitable accommodations and undesirable holiday makers, but everyone except for George manages to have fun in the sun.

Plot
A Chicago salesman (Charles Grodin) takes his wife (Robin Pearson Rose) and children to Club Sand, a hot spot surrounded by barbed wire.

Cast
 Charles Grodin as George Lollar
 Megan Mullally as Jessica Lollar
 Scott Nemes as Bobby Lollar
 Robin Pearson Rose as Sheila Lollar
 Christopher Ames as Brad Lollar
 Ian Abercrombie as The Maitre d'
 John Ashton as Phil Cocoran
 Ellen Blake as Dorothy Cocoran
 Brenda Bakke as Veroneeka
 Gerrit Graham as Curt
 Phil Hartman as Jean-Michel
 Chip Johannessen as The Firebreather
 Steve Levitt as Pierre
 Jon Lovitz as The Bartender
 Michael Markowitz as Guerilla
 David Mirkin as Walter Ambrose
 Mario Van Peebles as Pino
 Jacob Vargas as Carlos
 Brett Baxter Clark as Manuello
 Buck Young as Mr. Emerson
 Zane Buzby as Martine

References

External links
 
 

1986 films
1980s sex comedy films
American sex comedy films
Films about vacationing
Films set on islands
Teen sex comedy films
1986 directorial debut films
1986 comedy films
1980s English-language films
1980s American films